The following bills and Acts of Congress in the United States have been known as the Federal-Aid Highway Act or similar names:

Federal Aid Road Act of 1916: July 11, 1916, ch. 241,  (first)
Federal Aid Highway Act of 1921 (Phipps Act): November 9, 1921, 
Amendment and Authorization of 1925: merely continued existing funding, February 12, 1925, 
Amendment and Authorization of 1926: June 22, 1926, 
Federal Aid for Toll Bridges: March 3, 1927, 
Amendment of 1928: May 21, 1928, 
Authorization for Forest Roads and Amendment of 1930: May 5, 1930, 
Provision for National-Park Approaches: January 31, 1931, 
Hayden-Cartwright Act of 1934: June 18, 1934, 
Authorization and Amendment of 1936: June 16, 1936, 
Federal Aid Highway Act of 1938: June 8, 1938, ch. 328, 
Federal-Aid Highway Act of 1944: December 20, 1944, 
Federal-Aid Highway Act of 1948: June 29, 1948, 
Federal-Aid Highway Act of 1950: September 7, 1950, 
Federal-Aid Highway Act of 1952: June 25, 1952, 
Federal-Aid Highway Act of 1954: May 6, 1954, 
Federal-Aid Highway Act of 1956 (National Interstate and Defense Highways Act): June 29, 1956, 
Federal-Aid Highway Act of 1958: August 7, 1958
Federal-Aid Highway Act of 1959: September 21, 1959, 
Federal Highway Act of 1960: July 14, 1960, 
Federal-Aid Highway Act of 1961: June 29, 1961, 
Federal-Aid Highway Act of 1962: , October 23, 1962, 
Federal-Aid Highway Amendments Act of 1963: October 24, 1963, 
Federal-Aid Highway Act of 1964: , August 13, 1964, 
Joint Resolution of 1965: August 28, 1965, 
Federal-Aid Highway Act of 1966: , September 13, 1966, 
Federal-Aid Highway Act of 1968: , August 23, 1968, 
Federal-Aid Highway Act of 1970: , title I, December 31, 1970, 
Federal-Aid Highway Act of 1973: , title I, August 13, 1973, 
Federal-Aid Highway Amendments of 1974: January 4, 1975, 
Federal-Aid Highway Act of 1976: , title I, May 5, 1976, 
Federal-Aid Highway Act of 1978: , title I, November 6, 1978, 
Federal-Aid Highway Act of 1981: December 29, 1981, 
Federal-Aid Highway Act of 1982: , title I, January 6, 1983, 
Federal-Aid Highway Act of 1987 (Surface Transportation and Uniform Relocation Assistance Act): , title I, April 2, 1987,

References
Federal Highway Administration, America's Highways: 1776–1976, pp. 546–547

External links
 – "Federal Aid Highways"